Southern Star Concrete, Inc. or simply Southern Star is a concrete supply business headquartered in Irving, Texas. Southern Star is owned by Cementos Argos S.A., the largest cement producer in Colombia, South America. Cementos Argos is subsidiary of Inversiones Argos, which in turn belongs to a larger conglomerate called Grupo Empresarial Antioqueño based in Medellín, Colombia.

Argos acquired full ownership of Southern Star Concrete in November 2005 in a purchase agreement with the former owners, Texas Growth Fund and Austin Ventures, both based in Austin, Texas.

Southern Star is the largest ready-mixed concrete supplier in Texas and Arkansas, and also one of the largest ready-mix companies in the United States. It has about four dozen concrete plants in Little Rock, Arkansas, Dallas-Fort Worth and Houston, Texas.

External links
 Southern Star official website

Building materials companies of the United States
Manufacturing companies based in Irving, Texas